James Tilquist is an American professional wrestler better known by the ring name Big Tilly. He is best known for being a member of the tag team Phi Delta Slam as well as his appearances in Total Nonstop Action Wrestling. In early 2009 he returned to TNA under ring name Big Rocco as one half of The Main Event Mafia's (and later Mick Foley's) personal security force.

Professional wrestling career
Tilly worked for World Championship Wrestling throughout the mid-1990s as a jobber. He later began wrestling primarily on the Floridian independent circuit, where he formed a tag team with Bruno Sassi known as Phi Delta Slam. Phi Delta Slam used the gimmick of a pair of boisterous fraternity members.

Total Nonstop Action Wrestling (2005, 2007, 2009–2010)
Phi Delta Slam were introduced to Total Nonstop Action Wrestling (TNA) after Dusty Rhodes told his two competing assistants, Traci Brooks and Trinity, to each find a tag team. The tag teams would wrestle one another at Destination X, with the winning tag team's sponsor becoming Rhodes' sole assistant. Trinity selected Phi Delta Slam, and they debuted in February 2005, wrestling dark matches. They made their on-screen debut on March 13 at Destination X, where they lost to Traci's choice, The Harris Brothers. Phi Delta Slam remained in TNA for several weeks afterwards, but were unable to get over with fans, and began appearing only sporadically with the promotion. In September 2005, their profiles were removed from the TNA website, confirming that the team was gone from TNA.

Tilly and Sassi later made a cameo appearance in a series of comedy segments on the December 20, 2007 episode of Impact! where they were seen at Eric Young's Christmas party, which also involved the likes of Luke Williams, Kevin Nash, ODB, and Awesome Kong.

Return
In early 2009, both Tilly and Sassi returned to TNA as the personal security of The Main Event Mafia in order to help them fend off The TNA Front Line. In order play into the mafia aspect of the stable, Tilly was renamed to Rocco (before it was later tweaked to Big Rocco), he began wearing sunglasses at all times, he dyed his normally brown hair to black and began sporting a goatee. On the March 13 edition of Impact!, Sal and Kurt Angle accompanied Rocco as he wrestled Front Line member Eric Young in the main event, which he lost after Young pinned him following a Death Valley driver. On the April 2 edition of Impact!, Rocco and Sal challenged and lost to Team 3D. On the May 7 edition of Impact! they were defeated in a handicap match by Matt Morgan. On the May 28 edition of Impact! Sting, the new leader of the Main Event Mafia, fired Rocco and Sal. On the June 4, 2009, edition of Impact! Rocco and Sal were hired by Mick Foley. The two of them have since made only sporadic appearances as security men.

On August 8, 2010, at ECW reunion show, Hardcore Justice, Tilquist portrayed a fake version of The Blue Meanie, using the name Blue Tilly, and, along with Hollywood Nova, accompanied Stevie Richards to the ring. Later in the night Tilly and Nova attacked Tommy Dreamer during his match with Raven.

Independent circuit
Phi Delta Slam is currently wrestling with the South Florida based Coastal Championship Wrestling. In addition, all three members of Phi Delta Slam (Sassi, Tilly and Evans) operate a professional wrestling school called "Bodyslam University" in Fort Lauderdale, Florida.

Championships and accomplishments
American Wrestling Federation (Puerto Rico)
AWF Tag Team Championship (1 time) – with Bruno Sassi
Coastal Championship Wrestling
CCW Tag Team Championship (1 time) – with Bruno Sassi
Florida Wrestling Alliance
FWA Tag Team Championship (4 times) – with Bruno Sassi
Independent Pro Wrestling Association
IPWA Tag Team Championship (5 times) – with Bruno Sassi
International Wrestling Federation
IWF Tag Team Championship (4 times) – with Bruno Sassi
South Eastern Championship Wrestling
SECW Tag Team Championship (1 time) – with Bruno Sassi
World Wide Wrestling
WWW Tag Team Championship (2 times) – with Bruno Sassi

See also
Bruno Sassi

References

External links
PhiDeltaSlam.com (Official Website of Phi Delta Slam)
 Profile at FOW.com

American male professional wrestlers
Year of birth missing (living people)
Living people
Place of birth missing (living people)
The Blue World Order members